Josue Monge is a Costa Rican footballer who plays as a midfielder for the Treasure Coast Tritons in USL League Two and the South Florida Bulls men's soccer program.

Career

Professional
Monge played for the Philadelphia Union's academy. In 2016 he joined their affiliate, Bethlehem Steel FC on an amateur contract, to maintain his eligibility. Monge is committed to play college soccer at the University of South Florida.

References

External links 
 

1999 births
Living people
Costa Rican footballers
Costa Rican expatriate footballers
Philadelphia Union II players
South Florida Bulls men's soccer players
Association football midfielders
Expatriate soccer players in the United States
USL Championship players
Soccer players from Philadelphia
Treasure Coast Tritons players